Vendeurs de larmes is the sixth studio album of French singer Daniel Balavoine, that was released in April 1982 and was a success with sales of 600,000 copies in France. It was also a new revival of French pop rock, and the single "Vivre ou survivre" from the album proved to be one of the greatest hits for Balavoine. Other notable songs included "Dieu que l'amour est triste" and "Soulève moi".

The album contains 13 recordings including the self-titled "Vendeurs de larmes", whereas "Viens danser" / "La danse" is a lyrical and instrumental continuation of each other.

Track list
Pour faire un disque (1:23)
Vivre ou survivre (3:33)
Je veux de l'or (3:42)
Dieu que l'amour est triste (4:02)
C'est fini (4:08)
Soulève-moi (3:33)
L'amour gardé secret (4:05)
La fillette de l'étang (3:20)
Y a pas de bon numéro (2:50)
Vendeurs de larmes (4:40)
Viens danser (3:37)
La danse (4:05)
Au revoir (4:01)

Awards
In 1982, the album won the "Prix Diamant de la chanson française" award.

1982 albums
French-language albums